Epameinondas Pentheroudakis tou Georgiou (Episkopi, Lappes, 1926 – 1996) was a general of the Greek army. He acted as the Chief of the Hellenic Army General Staff from 1984 to 1986.

He was a close associate of Antonis Drossoyannis.

References 

Chiefs of the Hellenic Army General Staff
1926 births
1996 deaths
People from Lappa, Rethymno
National and Kapodistrian University of Athens alumni
Greek military personnel of the Greek Civil War